This is a list of music-related events in 1803.

Events
 5 April – first performance of Beethoven's Third Piano Concerto
 26 December – Haydn performs his last public concert, conducting The Seven Last Words of Christ

Classical music
Ludwig van Beethoven
Violin Sonata No. 7 published, composed between 1801 and 1802
Violin Sonata No. 9
Trio in E-flat major, Op. 38
3 Marches, Op. 45
Piano Sonata No. 21 "Waldstein" started, Op. 53
Symphony No. 3 "Eroica", Op. 55
Christus am Ölberge, oratorio, Op. 85
Das Glück der Freundschaft, Op. 88
10 Variations on 'Ich bin der Schneider Kakadu', Op. 121a
Minuet, WoO 82
Johann Evangelist Brandl – Symphony in D major, Op. 25
Bernhard Henrik Crusell – Concerto for Clarinet No. 3 in B-flat major
Franz Danzi 
Preiss Gottes, P.48
Sextet in E major, Op. 15
Jan Ladislav Dussek – Piano Quartet in E-flat Major Op. 53 or 56
Anton Eberl – Symphony in E-flat major, Op. 33
Joseph Haydn 
unfinished String Quartet in D minor, Op. 103
6 Trios, Liv. 1
Jeremiah Ingalls – "Northfield"
Franz Krommer 
Concerto No.1 for 2 Clarinets, Op. 35
Clarinet Concerto No.1, Op. 36
Concerto for Oboe in F Major (Op. 37)
Symphony No. 2, Op. 40
Niccolo Paganini 
Sonata concertata, MS 2
Grande sonata, MS 3
Le streghe, Op. 8
Georg von Pasterwitz – 300 Themata und Versetten, Op. 4
Ignaz Pleyel – 3 Keyboard Trios, B.474–476
Pierre Rode – Violin Concerto No.7 in A minor, Op. 9
Bernard Romberg 
Cello Concerto No.1, Op. 2
3 Grand Sonatas, Op. 5
Antonio Salieri – Gesù al limbo für Soli, vierstimmigen Chor und Orchester
Louis Spohr – Violin Concerto in C Major
Giovanni Battista Viotti – 
Trio for 2 Violins and Cello in E major
Trio for 2 Violins and Cello in G major
Joseph Wölfl – Symphony in G minor, Op. 40

Opera
Gaetano Andreozzi – 
Luigi Cherubini – Anacréon
Anton Fischer – 
Ferdinando Paër – Sargino
Giovanni Paisiello – Proserpine
Antonio Salieri – Die Hussiten vor Naumburg

Births
January 1 – Carolina Brunström, ballerina (d. 1855)
January 6 – Henri Herz, pianist and composer (died 1888)
February 17 – Joseph-Philippe Simon, librettist and actor (died 1891)
April 2 – Franz Lachner, Bavarian composer/conductor (died 1890) 
April 12 – Anton Wilhelm von Zuccalmaglio, lyricist and composer (died 1869)
May 12 – Alexandre Montfort, French composer (died 1856)
June 24 – George James Webb, composer (died 1887)
June 30 – Thomas Lovell Beddoes, librettist and poet (died 1849)
July 8 – Julius Mosen, librettist and lawyer (died 1867)
July 19 – Franz von Kobell, lyricist and mineralogist (died 1882) 
July 20 – Jakob Zeugheer, composer and violininst (died 1865)
July 24 – Adolphe Adam, French composer (died 1856)
July 25 – Ferdinand Beyer, arranger and composer (died 1863)
September 4 – Anna Nielsen, mezzo-soprano (died 1856)
September 12 – Auguste Brizeux lyricist and artist (died 1858)
October 11 – Prosper Mérimée, lyricist and writer (died 1870)
December 5 – Fyodor Tyutchev, lyricist and poet (died 1873)
December 11 – Hector Berlioz, composer (died 1869) 
date unknown – Jan z Hvězdy, lyricist and writer (died 1853)

Deaths
January 17 – Franz Ignaz von Beecke, composer (born 1733)
January 18 – Sylvain Maréchal, lyricist and writer (born 1750)
January 28 – Karl von Marinelli, theatre manager (born 1745)
February 5 – Giovanni Battista Casti, librettist and poet (born 1724)
February 6 – Gasparo Angiolini, dancer, choreographer and composer (born 1731)
February 16 – Giovanni Punto, composer and horn player (born 1746)
February 18 – Johann Wilhelm Ludwig Gleim, lyricist and poet (born 1719)
March 14 – Friedrich Gottlieb Klopstock, lyricist and poet (born 1724)
June 6 – Louis Gallodier, dancer and choreographer (born c.1734)
July 5 – William Jackson, composer and organist (born 1730)
July 14 – Esteban Salas y Castro, Cuban composer (born 1725)
August 29 – Giovanni de Gamerra, librettist and cleric (born 1742)
September 5 – François Devienne, composer (born 1759)
September 17 – Franz Xaver Süssmayr, composer (born 1766)
September 21 – John Christopher Moller, composer and music publisher (born 1755)
October 7 – Pierre Vachon, composer (born 1738)
October 8 – Vittorio Alfieri, librettist and dramatist (born 1749)
December 18 – Johann Gottfried Herder, lyricist and philosopher (born 1744) 
date unknown 
Johann Becker, organist and composer (born 1726)
Johann Christoph Kellner, organist and composer (born 1736)

References

 
19th century in music
Music by year